This is a list of subcamps of the Mauthausen concentration camp.  The slave labour of the inmates was also used by a variety of companies and farms that accommodated a small number of inmates on their own.

List of subcamps
 Aflenz
 Amstetten
 Frauenlager
 Männerlager
 Attnang-Puchheim
 Bachmanning
 Bretstein: KZ-Nebenlager Bretstein
 Dipoldsau
 Ebelsberg
 Ebensee: KZ Ebensee
 Eisenerz
 Enns
 Ennsdorf
 Floridsdorf
 Frankenburg am Hausruck (Schlier-Redl-Zipf)
 Graz
 Grein
 Großraming
 Gunskirchen
 Waldwerke I
 Sammellager
 Gusen complex
 Gusen I (located at Gusen in the community of Langenstein)
 Gusen II (located at St Georgen in the community of Sankt Georgen an der Gusen)
 Gusen III (located at Lungitz in the community of Katsdorf)
 Haidfeld
 Schloß Hartheim, not properly a subcamp of Mauthausen but an institution of the Aktion T-4 where some thousands inmates of Mauthausen-Gusen and Dachau were killed.
 Hinterbrühl
 Hirtenberg
 Hollenstein
 Jedlsee
 Klagenfurt
 Lambach
 Schloß Lannach
 Leibnitz
 Lenzing
 Schloß Lind
 Lindau
 Linz
 Aufräumungskommando
 Linz I
 Linz II
 Linz III
 Loibl-Paß
 Nord
 Süd
 Marialanzendorf
 Mauthausen
 main camp
 Mauthausen Soviet prisoners of war camp
 Zeltlager Mauthausen (tent camp)
 Schiff — Donauhafen Mauthausen
 Melk
 Mistelbach am der Zaya
 Schloß Mittersill (Zell am See)
 Moosbierbaum
 Passau
 Passau I (Oberilzmühle)
 Passau II (Waldwerke Passau-Ilzstadt)
 Passau III (Jandelsbrunn)
 Peggau
 Perg (Arbeitseinsatzstelle)
 Rheydt
 Ried
 Schönbrunn
 Schwechat
 Steyr
 St. Aegyd am Neuwalde
 St. Lambrecht
 Frauenlager
 Männerlager
 St. Valentin
 Steyr-Münichholz
 Ternberg
 Vöcklabrück
 Vöcklabrück I
 Vöcklabrück II
 Vöcklamarkt (Schlier Redl-Zipf)
 Wagram
 Wels
 Wels I
 Wels II
 Weyer
 Wien
 AFA-Werke
 Wien-Floridsdorf
 Wien-Floridsdorf II (Schwechat II)
 Wien-Floridsdorf III (Schwechat III)
 Wien-Heidfeld (Schwechat I)
 Wien-Hinterbrühl (Arbeitslager Haidfeld)
 Wien-Hinterbrühl (See Grotte)
 Wien-Jedlesee
 Wien-Maria-Lanzendorf
 Wien-Mödling
 Wien-Schönbrunn (Kraftfahrtechnische Lehranstalt)
 Wien-Schwechat ("Santa")
 Wien-West (Saurerwerke)
 Wiener Neudorf
 Wiener Neustadt
 Raxwerke GmbH (opened twice)

See also
 List of Nazi-German concentration camps
 List of subcamps of Dachau, other extensive net of camps operating in Austria and southern Germany

References

External links
 List of Mauthausen Satellite Camps (English)
 List of Mauthausen Satellite Camps (German)
  Map of Mauthausen Satellite Camps
Subcamps of Mauthausen
Mauthausen